Normal backwardation, also sometimes called backwardation, is the market condition where the price of a commodity's forward or futures contract is trading below the expected spot price at contract maturity. The resulting futures or forward curve would typically be downward sloping (i.e. "inverted"), since contracts for further dates would typically trade at even lower prices. In practice, the expected future spot price is unknown, and the term "backwardation" may refer to "positive basis", which occurs when the current spot price exceeds the price of the future.

The opposite market condition to normal backwardation is known as contango. Contango refers to "negative basis" where the future price is trading above the expected spot price.

Note: In industry parlance backwardation may refer to the situation that futures prices are below the current spot price.

Backwardation occurs when the difference between the forward price and the spot price is less than the cost of carry (when the forward price is less than the spot plus carry), or when there can be no delivery arbitrage because the asset is not currently available for purchase.

In a state of backwardation, futures contract prices include compensation for the risk transferred from the underlying asset holder to the purchaser of the futures contract. This means the expected spot price on expiry is higher than the price of the futures contract. Backwardation very seldom arises in money commodities like gold or silver. In the early 1980s, there was a one-day backwardation in silver while some metal was physically moved from COMEX to CBOT warehouses. Gold has historically been positive with exception for momentary backwardations (hours) since gold futures started trading on the Winnipeg Commodity Exchange in 1972.

The term is sometimes applied to forward prices other than those of futures contracts, when analogous price patterns arise. For example, if it costs more to lease silver for 30 days than for 60 days, it might be said that the silver lease rates are "in backwardation". Negative lease rates for silver may indicate bullion banks require a risk premium for selling silver futures into the market.

Occurrence 
This is the case of a convenience yield that is greater than the risk free rate and the carrying costs.

It is argued that backwardation is abnormal, and suggests supply insufficiencies in the corresponding (physical) spot market. However, many commodities markets are frequently in backwardation, especially when the seasonal aspect is taken into consideration, e.g., perishable and/or soft commodities.

In Treatise on Money (1930, chapter 29), economist John Maynard Keynes argued that in commodity markets, backwardation is not an abnormal market situation, but rather arises naturally as "normal backwardation" from the fact that producers of commodities are more prone to hedge their price risk than consumers. The academic dispute on the subject continues to this day.

Examples 
Notable examples of backwardation include:

 Copper circa 1990, apparently arising from market manipulation by Yasuo Hamanaka of Sumitomo Corporation in what has come to be called the "Sumitomo copper affair".
 In 2013, the wholesale commercial gas market entered backwardation during the month of March. The 2-year contract prices fell below the price of 1-year contracts.

Origin of term: London Stock Exchange
Like contango, the term originated in mid-19th century England, originating from "backward".

In that era on the London Stock Exchange, backwardation was a fee paid by a seller wishing to defer delivering stock they had sold.  This fee was paid either to the buyer, or to a third party who lent stock to the seller.

The purpose was normally speculative, allowing short selling.  Settlement days were on a fixed schedule (such as fortnightly) and a short seller did not have to deliver stock until the following settlement day, and on that day could "carry over" their position to the next by paying a backwardation fee.  This practice was common before 1930, but came to be used less and less, particularly since options were reintroduced in 1958.

The fee here did not indicate a near-term shortage of stock the way backwardation means today, it was more like a "lease rate", the cost of borrowing a stock or commodity for a period of time.

Normal backwardation vs. backwardation
The term backwardation, when used without the qualifier "normal", can be somewhat ambiguous.  Although sometimes used as a synonym for normal backwardation (where a futures contract price is lower than the expected spot price at contract maturity), it may also refer to the situation where a futures contract price is merely lower than the current spot price.

See also 
 Contango

References

 Encyclopædia Britannica, eleventh edition (1911), articles Backwardation, Contango and Stock Exchange, and fifteenth edition (1974), articles Contango and Backwardation and Stock Market.
Modern Market Manipulation, Mike Riess, 2003, paper at the International Precious Metals Institute 27th Annual Conference
LME launches and investigation in primary aluminium trading, London Metal Exchange advice to members 15 January 1999, reproduced at aluNET International
  New Orleans – Temporary Suspension of Warrants, London Metal Exchange press release 6 September 2005.
 investopedia Website, Articles on Contango and Backwardation and Stock Market''.

Arbitrage
Derivatives (finance)